Naranjal is a canton in the province of Guayas in western continental Ecuador. The canton was named after its seat, Naranjal.

Demographics
Ethnic groups as of the Ecuadorian census of 2010:
Mestizo  74.1%
Montubio  10.9%
Afro-Ecuadorian  8.7%
White  5.5%
Indigenous  0.7%
Other  0.2%

References

Cantons of Guayas Province